Good Person is the second studio album by American singer-songwriter Ingrid Andress. It was released on August 26, 2022 via Warner Music Nashville. "Wishful Drinking", a duet with Sam Hunt, was released as the album's lead-off single in December 2021.

Background
Andress co-wrote and co-produced all 13 tracks on Good Person, with additional producing done by Sam Ellis, AJ Pruis, and Jordan Schmidt. She co-wrote several tracks with Ellis and Derrick Southerland who contributed heavily to Lady Like, and also wrote with notable songwriters such as Shane McAnally, Julia Michaels, and JP Saxe.

Although Andress initially stated that she would not include her single "Wishful Drinking" on Good Person, it was featured as a bonus track on the digital versions of the album.

Singles and commercial performance
"Wishful Drinking" was released on August 2, 2021 and sent to country radio in December 2021 as the album's lead-off single. It became a top 5 hit on the Billboard Country Airplay chart, Andress' second and Hunt's 11th. It also peaked at number 47 on the Billboard Hot 100 and at number 11 on the Billboard Hot Country Songs chart. "Seeing Someone Else" was issued to the HAC format in September 2022 as the album's second single. It has since reached number 26 on that chart. "Feel Like This" was released on February 6, 2023 as the second single to country radio (third overall) from Good Person.

Good Person debuted at number 18 on the Billboard Top Country Albums chart.

Promotion
Andress announced The Good Person Tour in support of the record, which kicks off on February 23, 2023 in Salt Lake City and runs until the end of May 2023. She also promoted the record as an opening act on Keith Urban's The Speed of Now World Tour.

Track listing

Charts

References

Warner Records albums
Ingrid Andress albums
2022 albums